Bulldog is an Argentine punk rock band formed in 1989

Discography

Si Yo! (1995)
Un Lugar Para Juntarnos (1997)
El Ángel de la Muerte (1998)
Circo Calesita (2000)
El Campo de los Sueños (2002)
Todos los perros van al cielo (2004)
Yo estuve ahí... nosotros también (live, part 1) (2005)
Yo estuve ahí... nosotros también (live, part 2) (2006)
Salvaje (2007)
Repolución (2009)

See also
Argentine punk
Argentine rock

Argentine punk rock groups